Žnjan is the largest beach in Split, Croatia. It is located in the eastern part of the city. Like most of the Croatian coast, it is mostly a pebble beach. Along the beach, there is a promenade connecting Žnjan with nearby  beach.

Žnjan is currently in the process of demolishing illegal structures along the beach. It is also reconstructing other buildings; this restoration was scheduled to be finished by July 1, 2018.

References 

Split, Croatia